Cyril R. Jandus (July 22, 1867–March 6, 1933) was an American politician and lawyer.

Jandus was born in Bohemia. He emigrated to the United States in 1868 and settled in Chicago, Illinois. He went to the Chicago public schools. Jandus was admitted to the Illinois bar in 1896 and practiced law in Chicago. He served as an assistant city prosecutor and as an assistant corporation counsel for the city of Chicago. Jandus served in the Illinois House of Representatives rom 1901 to 1903. He then served in the Illinois Senate from 1903 to 1911. He was a Democrat. Jandus died at his home in Chicago, Illinois.

Notes

External links

1867 births
1933 deaths
Austro-Hungarian emigrants to the United States
Lawyers from Chicago
Politicians from Chicago
Democratic Party members of the Illinois House of Representatives
Democratic Party Illinois state senators